Dubliany is an urban-type settlement in Sambir Raion of Lviv Oblast in Ukraine. Dubliany belongs to Novyi Kalyniv urban hromada, one of the hromadas of Ukraine. Population:

Economy

Transportation
Dubliany railway station is on the railway line connecting Sambir and Stryi. There is regular passenger traffic.

The settlement has access, via both Sambir and Novyi Kalyniv, to Highway H13 which connects Lviv and Uzhhorod.

References

Urban-type settlements in Sambir Raion